Heiko Meyer (born 2 December 1976 in Dresden, Sachsen) is a German diver who competed in the 2000 Summer Olympics. He won a bronze medal with Jan Hempel in the men's 10 m platform synchronized event.

References
 

1976 births
Living people
German male divers
Divers at the 2000 Summer Olympics
Divers at the 2004 Summer Olympics
Olympic divers of Germany
Olympic bronze medalists for Germany
Divers from Dresden
Olympic medalists in diving
Medalists at the 2000 Summer Olympics
21st-century German people